Senoko is located in Sembawang, in the northern part of Singapore. It is most known for Senoko Power Station, which generates and supplies electricity, and the Senoko Fishing Port.

Etymology
In Franklin and Jackson's Plan of Singapore (1830), the place name Senoko was found and referred to the "River Simko" or Sungei Senoko in Malay. The river is now merged into Sungei Sembawang, which currently has the mouth of the former Sungei Senoko.

Transportation
Tower Transit Singapore Service 981 goes to Senoko Industrial Estate, while Tower Transit Singapore Services 169 and 856 plies through Admiralty Road West.

The closest MRT line is Woodlands North MRT station located at Woodlands North Coast Road.

References
Victor R Savage, Brenda S A Yeoh (2004), Toponymics - A Study of Singapore Street Names, Eastern University Press, 

Places in Singapore
Sembawang